Lourna Jane Pujeda Reyes (born December 25, 1987), known professionally as LJ Reyes, is a Filipino actress. She is best known as one of the Final Four in the second season of the widely acclaimed GMA reality TV show, StarStruck. She won Best Actress at the 39th Gawad Urian Awards.

Life and career
LJ Reyes was born in Fairview, Quezon City. She spent her high school days at St. Stephen's High School. 

In 2004, Reyes auditioned for the second season of StarStruck where she ended up as First Princess. Her first show was Now and Forever: Mukha, where she worked with StarStruck runners-up and winners Ryza Cenon, CJ Muere and Mike Tan. Aside from acting, she is also a good dancer, performing with Cenon, Mark Herras, Marky Cielo among others. She is involved mostly in supporting roles on GMA Network shows. 

Reyes had her biggest break as a lead villainess in Zaido: Pulis Pangkalawakan then, playing one of the leading ladies to JC de Vera in Babangon Ako't Dudurugin Kita. Reyes had another break by joining the cast of Una Kang Naging Akin, another Filipino soap opera. Reyes was given many praises by critics for her outstanding role in Una Kang Naging Akin which made her rise to fame. She posed for the local FHM magazine in December 2009 where she was also the cover girl.

In 2010, she formed a trio called SH3, with Ryza Cenon and Chynna Ortaleza, and they performed on the Sunday variety show SOP Rules until the group disbanded because of plagiarism issues. She won the 2010 Cinemalaya Best Supporting Actress for her role in the indie movie The Leaving.

Reyes was baptized in August 2015 as a Born Again Christian.

After 14 years, Reyes ended her GMA Artist Center contract with her last series appearance The Cure.

Personal life

She dated Paulo Avelino, a fellow GMA artist who was a contestant in the fourth season of StarStruck. On July 24, 2010, she gave birth to their son. She dated Paolo Contis from 2016 to 2021. On January 4, 2019, she gave birth to their daughter. On September 1, 2021, she confirmed that she and Paolo Contis were no longer together.

Filmography

Drama television shows

Film

Awards and nominations

References

External links
L.J. Reyes at iGMA.tv

gmanews.tv/video, LJ Reyes has someone new to replace Alfred Vargas - 23 January 2008 (in Filipino)
LJ Reyes kept her pregnancy a secret from co-workers in The Leaving

1987 births
De La Salle University alumni
21st-century Filipino actresses
Filipino child actresses
Filipino film actresses
Filipino television actresses
GMA Network personalities
Tagalog people
Filipino Christians
Filipino evangelicals
Filipino people of Chinese descent
People from Quezon City
Actresses from Metro Manila
StarStruck (Philippine TV series) participants
Filipina gravure idols
Living people